Guyana: Crime of the Century (also known as Guyana: Cult of the Damned) is a 1979 English-language Mexican exploitation drama film written and directed by René Cardona Jr. The film, which was shot in Mexico, is based on the Jonestown Massacre. It stars a number of American actors such as Stuart Whitman, Gene Barry and Joseph Cotten. The names of central characters are slightly tweaked from the historical ones: the film is set in "Johnsontown" rather than Jonestown, the cult is led by "Reverend James Johnson" (Whitman) rather than Rev. Jim Warren Jones, and the murdered Congressman is "Lee O'Brien" (Barry) rather than Leo Ryan.

Plot
In early 1977, Reverend James Johnson, the fanatic and paranoid leader of an independent church in San Francisco, moves his 1,000-strong congregation to the jungles of South American in the country of Guyana to create their own utopia free of the so-called corruption of the civilized world. Life at the jungle commune, called "Johnsontown", becomes unbearable as there are featured acts of brutally and cruelty that Johnson inflicts on his followers. In November 1978, when California Congressman Lee O'Brien investigates several reports of commune members being held against their will, he ventures to Johnsontown with a team of reporters to investigate the allegations of abuse. Despite the positive facade that Reverend Johnson puts out to Congressman O'Brien, the reality of the camp becomes apparent. When O'Brien leaves Johnsontown with a group of defectors, Johnson orders his loyal hit squads to kill O'Brien and the reporters, and then orders his followers to commit ritual mass suicide.

Cast
 Stuart Whitman as Reverend James Johnson
 Gene Barry as Congressman Lee O'Brien
 John Ireland as Dave Cole
 Joseph Cotten as Richard Gable
 Bradford Dillman as Dr. Gary Shaw
 Jennifer Ashley as Anna Kazan
 Yvonne De Carlo as Susan Ames
 Nadiuska as Leslie Stevens
 Tony Young as Ron Harvey
 Erika Carlsson as Marilyn Johnson
 Robert DoQui as Oliver Ross
 Hugo Stiglitz as Cliff Robson
 Carlos East as Mike Sheldon
 Edith González as Commune member

Reception

Roger Ebert of the Chicago Sun-Times gave the film 0 out of 4 and wrote: "The movie brings absolutely no insights to Guyana. It exploits human suffering for profit. It is a geek show. Universal and its exhibitors should be ashamed."

Historical inaccuracies

Most notably, the "Johnsontown" membership is largely cast with white actors, while in reality, and at its height, the majority (68%) of Peoples Temple members were African-American. 

Moreover, the film depicts "Susan Ames" (the fictionalized version of Peoples Temple loyalist Sharon Amos, as played by Yvonne De Carlo) being murdered, along with her children, by a shadowy, knife-wielding man. In reality, Sharon Amos—a hardcore supporter of Jim Jones stationed in nearby Georgetown—followed the orders of Jones for his followers to die on 18 November 1978. Amos reportedly took a kitchen butcher knife and slit the throats of her two youngest children (Christa, age 11, and Martin, age 10), then asked her eldest daughter Liane (age 21) to kill her with the knife, thus leaving Liane to kill herself.

A minor inaccuracy concerns the "Johnson" death scene; as Johnson (Stuart Whitman) appears to expire from a gunshot, as he collapses, he pulls his shirt open by the lower four buttons. This is meant to explain why in actual Jonestown death scene photos, Jim Jones is seen lying on the pavilion floor with his red shirt open. The real reason Jones' shirt is open is unknown. It is open on the first photo after his death, and there is no evidence of decomposition changes on there, so the effects of swelling during the bloating stage of decomposition did not cause his shirt to open.

References

External links
 
 

1979 films
1970s exploitation films
Mexican docudrama films
English-language Mexican films
Films set in Guyana
Films set in 1977
Films set in 1978
Works about Jonestown
Crime films based on actual events
Films directed by René Cardona Jr.
Films scored by Jimmie Haskell
Universal Pictures films
Cultural depictions of Jim Jones
1970s historical films
Films shot in Mexico
1970s English-language films
Films about cults